Synergy International Systems, Inc. ("Synergy") is an information technology and consulting company based in Washington, D.C. that provides web-based software to international development agencies, country governments, NGOs and private sector partners. The key products focused on monitoring and evaluation (M&E), national development effectiveness, and aid management, judicial system modernization, social protection, public financial management (PFM), disaster relief and reconstruction, environment, education, and public health. The company maintain a Global Learning Center in Yerevan, Armenia. Its services include software development and customization, IT strategy consulting, systems integration, capacity development and technical support.
Synergy has developed management information systems for public and private sector clients in 65 countries.

History 
The company was founded in Washington, D.C. in 1997. It is incorporated under the laws of the Commonwealth of Virginia in the United States.
Synergy's first product was a PC system – Donor Assistance Database, developed in the scope of the G7 Support Implementation Group project in 1996, to monitor aid assistance donated from the international community. The PC system was developed for the Russian Federation in 1996. The system, later on, was developed for the Newly Independent States of the former Soviet Union, including  Armenia, Georgia, Kazakhstan, Kyrgyzstan, Turkmenistan, Ukraine, and Tajikistan.

Synergy International Systems opened its Global Learning Center in Yerevan, Armenian in 1999. Synergy currently employs around 200 highly professional staff in the areas of software development, systems analysis, systems integration, network administration, quality assurance, and business analysts.

Clients 
The overall clients include international government ministries and development partners, with a geographical coverage that includes countries in Africa, Asia-Pacific, Australia, the Caribbean, Central America, Europe, and the Middle East.  Synergy's clients also include such international organizations as the Asian Development Bank (ADB); the Global Fund to Fight AIDS, Tuberculosis and Malaria; German Development Cooperation (GIZ), the Inter-American Development Bank (IDB); the Millennium Challenge Corporation; the Organisation of Eastern Caribbean States (OECS); the United Nations Development Programme (UNDP); the United Nations Office for Project Services (UNOPS); the United States Agency for International Development (USAID); the United States Department of State (DOS); and the World Bank. Since 2005 Synergy has been working with The International Aid Transparency Initiative (IATI) as a member of the IATI Technical Advisory Group (TAG) aligning its aid information management solutions with the international protocols and principles of aid transparency.

Products 
 Synergy Indicata: M&E Software - An online monitoring and evaluation tool that captures performance and result data to measure the efficiency effectiveness, impact and sustainability of the implemented projects/programs. The software provides data management, performance monitoring, and indicator tracking capabilities to improve organization's monitoring and evaluation (M&E) processes and measure development results.
 Case Management System (CMS) - A web-based tool for justice sector institutions that allows to move from paper-based court case filing to the automation of the entire case life cycle from legal case initiation, assignment, necessary review and approvals to case processing and closure. The product is designed to better use and manage legal data, improve the business processes and increase the efficiency of the courts.
 Development Assistance Database (DAD) - An aid information management software for aid information collection, tracking, analysis and planning, which the company claims is used in more than 35 countries. Through DAD donor agencies in a country report on their development assistance projects, including project funding and results data designed to analyze aid flows, harmonize projects with policy priorities, and manage development funds with greater transparency and accountability.
 Social Protection Information System (SPIS) - A web-based software for managing social protection and social safety net programs. It is designed as an online toolset for the delivery of social benefits to poor and vulnerable people by providing beneficiary management, payment administration and cash transfers, monitoring and evaluation, feedback and complaints management.
 Public Investment Management (PIM) Suite - A web-based software designed to support management of public investments program (PIP) life-cycle, including submission, screening and approval of project proposals, allocation and execution of the capital budget.
 Post-Disaster Management Suite - A web-based software platform for planning, tracking and coordinating post-disaster recovery and reconstruction activities. It captures critical information such as affected locations and populations, emergency response efforts, estimates of damages, losses and needs and then matches this information with disaster recovery projects.
 State Budgeting System (SBS) - A public finance software solution which assists country governments to collect, analyze, and report key data for budget planning and execution. It automates the budget preparation and planning processes, tracks revisions and negotiations between the Ministry of Finance and line Ministries, analyzes budget data and monitors the budget execution.
 Education management information system (EMIS) - an education data collection, analysis and reporting toolset targeted at the needs of education ministries, educational institutions, and policy-makers.

Technology 
The technological foundation of Synergy's products is the proprietary technology platform - Intelligent Data Manager (IDM™). IDM is Commercial Off-the-Shelf (COTS) software technology platform that enables the creation of database-driven business applications. The core of IDM's metadata-driven architecture – knowledgebase, is a metadata repository that stores the logical representation of application features and functionality. This  knowledgebase and the resulting application data are animated by a modular suite of capabilities for data management, visualization, reporting, and business process automation and user management. The business requirements of a client are being tailored to the knowledgebase to create a wide array of data-driven business applications.

Recognition and awards 
Gartner included Synergy International Systems as a representative vendor in its 2015 Market Guide for Enterprise Program and Portfolio Management (EPPM) Software. In 2014 Synergy International Systems was recognized as 20 most promising project management solutions. Synergy was also awarded the Innovative Government Technology Award in the Information Management category at the 2008 FutureGov Summit for the development of the Recovery Aceh Nias (RAN) Database installed for the BRR – Reconstruction and Rehabilitation Agency of the Government of Indonesia.

See also 
Development Assistance Database (DAD)

References

External links 
Official website

Information technology companies of the United States